This is a list of lighthouses in Nigeria.

Lighthouses

See also
List of lighthouses in Benin (to the west)
List of lighthouses in Cameroon (to the east)
 Lists of lighthouses and lightvessels

References

External links

Nigeria
Lighthouses
Lighthouses